The 2008 Speedway World Cup Event 1 was the first race of the 2008 Speedway World Cup season. It took place on July 12, 2008 in the Alfred Smoczyk Stadium in Leszno, Poland.

Results

Heat details

Heat after heat 
 (61.01) Crump, Ferjan, Kasprzak, Gizatullin
 (59.77) Adams, Holta, Laguta, Tihanyi (T)
 (61.40) Gollob, Sullivan, Iwanow, Tabaka
 (61.44) Hampel, Watt, Gafurov, Magosi
 (61.63) Holder, Saifutdinov, Jaguś, Szatmari
 (60.75) Gollob, Saifutdinov, Crump, Magosi
 (61.08) Hampel, Adams, Gizatullin, Szatmari (e4)
 (61.52) Sullivan, Jaguś, Laguta, Ferjan
 (62.03) Watt, Kasprzak, Iwanow, Tihanyi
 (62.15) Holta, Holder, Gafurov, Tabaka
 (61.51) Hampel, Crump, Laguta, Tabaka
 (61.80) Adams, Jaguś, Iwanow, Magosi
 (62.64) Kasprzak, Laguta, Sullivan, Szatmari
 (62.43) Holta, Saifutdinov, Ferjan, Watt
 (62.51) Gizatullin, Gollob, Holder, Tihanyi
 (61.70) Holta, Crump, Iwanow, Szatmari
 (61.68) Adams, Ferjan, Gollob, Gafurov
 (62.20) Hampel, Saifutdinov, Sullivan, Tihanyi
 (62.16) Adams(J), Gizatullin, Tabaka, Jaguś (e4)
 (62.98) Holder, Kasprzak, Laguta, Magosi
 (62.37) Crump, Ferjan(J), Jaguś, Gafurov
 (62.23) Adams, Kasprzak, Gizatullin, Tabaka
 (63.48) Saifutdinov(J), Holta, Sullivan, Magosi
 (63.44) Gollob, Laguta, Watt, Szatmari
 (62.94) Hampel, Holder, Iwanow, Ferjan (e3)
 First Place Run-Off:
 (62.94) Adams, Hampel

References

See also 
 2008 Speedway World Cup
 motorcycle speedway

E1